Taradale is a residential neighbourhood in the northeast quadrant of Calgary, Alberta, Canada. It is located at the eastern edge of the city, and it is bounded to the north by Taradale Drive, to the east by 68 Street E, to the south by 64 Avenue N and to the west by Falconridge Boulevard.

The land was annexed to the City of Calgary in 1961, and Taradale was established in 1984. It is represented in the Calgary City Council by the Ward 3 councillor.

Demographics 
Taradale is home to a large South Asian population, majorly Indians, and Pakistani’s, with a small Afghan community. There is also a Filipino population.  

Residents in this community had a median household income of $58,309 in 2000, and there were 13.4% low income residents living in the neighbourhood. As of 2000, 27.8% of the residents were immigrants. All buildings were single-family detached homes, and 10.4% of the housing was used for renting.

Education 
Public schools in include Taradale Elementary School and Ted Harrison Middle School.

See also 
 List of neighbourhoods in Calgary

References

External links 
 Taradale Community Association

Neighbourhoods in Calgary